S. P. Pillai (28 November 1913  – 12 June 1985) was an Indian film and stage actor, best known for his comic roles in Malayalam films.

Biography
S. Pankajakshan Pillai alias S. P. Pillai was born in 1913 in the temple town of Ettumanoor in Kottayam district. His father Shankara Pillai, was a police constable. Pillai lost his parents at a young age itself. He could not get basic education but obtained training in Ottan Thullal from Kalamandalam for a few years. He started his career as a supporting actor in stage plays. His first film, Appan Thamburan's Bhootharayar, did not release. His first released film was Jnanambika (1940). He  shot to fame as a comedy actor after the superhit film Nalla Thanka (1951). He did notable roles in more than 300 films, including Snehaseema, Nayaru pidichapulivalu, Chemmen, Bharya, Vidarunna Mottukal. He played the role of Paananar in almost all the Vadakkan Pattu films of Udaya. He has even sung the song Vayaranu Nammalkku Daivam for the movie Thaskaraveeran, in 1957.  Sanchari (1981) was his last film. He won the Kerala State Film Award for Second Best Actor for his performance in Taxi Driver. He died on 12 June 1985. Actress Manju Pillai is his granddaughter.

Awards

Kerala State Film Awards:

Second Best Actor – 1977 – Taxi Driver
He was also honoured with the Kalaratnam Award by the Travancore Devaswom Board 
Mayoora Award. Okay

Filmography

As an actor

 1985 – Madhuvidhu Theerum Munpe
 1984 – Sabarimala Dharshanam
 1983 – Kaathirunna Naal
 1983 – Pallankuzhi
 1981 – Sanchari
 1980 – Palattu Kunjikannan
 1979 – Swapnangal Swanthamalla
 1978 – Kadathanattu Makkam
 1978 – Kaithappo
 1977 – Achaaram Ammini Osharam Omana  as Paulose
 1977 – Taxi Driver
 1977 - Vidarunna Mottukal as Pappan Pilla
 1976 – Pushppasharam
 1975 – Abhimanam
 1975 – Ullasa Yathra
 1975 – Boy Friend
 1975 – Swami Ayappan
 1974 – Pathiravum Pakalvelichavum
 1974 – Vandikkari
 1974 – Durga
 1974 – Check Post
 1974 – Thacholi Marumakan Chanthu as Vayttil Thampan
 1974 – Thumbolarcha as Panar
 1974 – Udayam Kizhakku Thanne
 1974 – Youvanam as Kunju Nair
 1974 – Nellu
 1973 – Swarga Puthri
 1973 – Nirmalyam
 1973 – Kaliyugham
 1973 – Masapadi Mathupilla
 1973 – Enippadikal
 1973 – Ponnapuram Kotta
 1973 – Pavangal Pennugal
 1973 – Manushyaputhran as Kunjandi
 1973 – Akasha Chakram
 1973 – Azhakulla Saleena as Paappi 
 1973 – Kaadu as Sankar
 1973 – Thekkankattu as Mathai
 1973 – Periyar
 1973 – Nakhangal
 1973 – Chenda
 1973 – Dharmayudham as Sankaran
 1973 – Thenaruvi
 1973 – Panitheeratha Veedu as Chacko/Jose's father
 1972 – Manushya Bandagal
 1972 – Prathikaram as Shobha's father
 1972 – Sathi
 1972 – Preethi
 1972 – Gandharavakshetram as Govindan Nair
 1972 – Postmane Kaanmanilla as Nanu Nair
 1972 – Oru Sundariyude Katha as Pappu Shipayi
 1972 – Vidyarthikale Ithile Ithile
 1972 – Nadan Premam
 1972 – Sree Guruvayoorappan
 1971 – Bobanum Moliyum
 1971 – Sarasayya as Chackochan
 1971 – Puthen Veedu
 1971 – Kuttyedathi as Govindan Nair
 1971 – Lora Nee Evide
 1971 – Aabhijathyam as Pappiashan
 1971 – Panchavan Kadu
 1971 – CID in Jungle
 1971 – Agni Mrigam
 1971 – Marunattil Oru Malayali as Vittal
 1971 – Kochaniyathi as Kunju Nair
 1971 – Avalappam Vaikipoyi
 1970 – Palunkupathram
 1970 – Naazhikakkallu
 1970 – Ningalenne Communistakki as Pappu
 1970 – Othenante Makan as Anakkan
 1970 – Pearl View as Boss
 1970 – Abhayam
 1970 – Dathuputhran as Kunjavarachan
 1970 – Madhuvidhu as Ganesh
 1970 – Swapnangal as Chellappan
 1970 – Nilakkatha Chalanangal
 1970 – Thara as Ayyappan
 1970 – Sabarimala Sree Dharmashastra
 1969 – Kumara Sambhavam as Vikadan
 1969 – Nurse
 1969 – Balatha Pahayan as Pillai
 1969 – Janmabhoomi
 1969 – Urangatha Sundari as Bhrandan
 1969 – Chattambikkavala
 1969 – Susy
 1969 – Koottukudumbam
 1969 – Jwala ... Pankan
 1969 – Kuruthikkalam
 1969 – Pooja Pushppam
 1968 – Thirichadi
 1968 – Kadal as Peter
 1968 – Pengal
 1968 – Hotel High Range as Velu Pilla
 1968 – Kaliyalla Kalyanam
 1968 – Kodugalooramma
 1968 – Punnapara Vayalar as Ouseph
 1968 – Adhyapika
 1968 – Karutha Pournami
 1967 – Arakkillam
 1967 – Nadanpennu
 1967 – Olathu Mathi
 1967 – Agniputhri as Embranthiri 
 1967 – NGO
 1967 – Khadeeja
 1967 – Thalirukal
 1967 – Lady Doctor as Thommi
 1967 – Karutha Rathrikal
 1967 – Mainatheruvi Kolacase
 1967 – Kavalam Chundan
 1967 – Mulkireedam
 1967 – Chitramela
 1967 – Chekuthante Kotta
 1967 – Kasavuthattam ...Paarakkoottathil Aliyaar
 1967 – Pavappettaval as Pappu Ashan
 1966 – Kattumallika
 1966 – Priyathama
 1966 – Anarkali as Kasim
 1966 – Kadamattathachan 
 1966 – Puthri as  Madhavan
 1965 – Kaathirunna Nikkah
 1965 – Jeevitha Yaathra as Ringmaster
 1965 – Kattupookkal
 1965 – Odayil Ninnu (1965) as Thoma
 1965 – Devatha
 1965 – Inapravukal
 1965 – Chemeen
 1965 – Muthalali
 1965 – Mayavi  as Kaimani
 1965 – Murappennu
 1965 – Kaliyodam
 1965 – Kavyamela as Swami
 1965 – Pattuthuvala as Philip
 1964 – Ore Bhoomi Ore Raktham
 1964 – Sree Guruvayoorappan as Panamaran
 1964 – Devalayam
 1964 – Karutha Kai as Damu
 1964 – Anna
 1964 – Atom Bomb as Kuttan Karanavar
 1964 – Althara
 1964 – Aadhya Kiranagal as Avaran
 1964 – Omanakuttan
 1964 – Thacholi Othenan as Chandu
 1964 – Manavatti
 1964 – School Master as Kuttan Pilla
 1964 – Oral Koodi Kallanayi as Kammathi
 1963 – Chilamboli
 1963 – Doctor as Keshavan
 1963 – Ammaye Kaanaan as Sankunni Nair
 1963 – Ninamaninja Kalpadukal as Bomb Kunjooju
 1963 – Kalayum Kaminiyum
 1963 – Kadalamma
 1963 – Snapaka Yohannan as Samuel
 1962 – Bharya
 1962 – Kannum Karalum
 1962 – Sreekovil
 1962 – Snehadeepam as Njaramban/Karnan
 1962 – Palattu Koman
 1962 – Puthiya Akasam Puthiya Bhoomi as Mammutty
 1961 – Christmas Rathri as Thoma
 1961 – Jnaanasundari as Antony
 1961 – Ummini Thanka
 1961 – Kandam Becha Kottu as Minnal Moideen
 1961 – Sabarimala Ayappan
 1961 – Arappavan.
as Raphael Mappila
 1961 – Bhakta Kuchela
 1960 – Umma as Vattathil Kurup
 1960 – Poothali
 1959 – Aana Valarthiya Vanambadi
 1958 – Lilly
 1958 –  Nairu Pidicha Pulivaalu as  Chanthukutty
 1958 – Mariakutty as Naanu
 1957 – Padatha Painkili as Mayilan
 1957 – Achanum Bakanum
 1957 – Thaskkara Veeran
 1957 – Jailppulli as Jambulingam
 1957 – Deva Sundari
 1956 – Manthravaadi
 1956 – Athmarppanam
 1955 – Harishchandra
 1955 – CID
 1955 – Aniyathi as S. P.
 1954 – Avan Varunnu
 1954 – Avakashi as Marthandan
 1954 – Balya Sakhi as Pankan
 1954 – Sneha Seema as Paili
 1954 – Sandehi
 1953 – Ponkathir
 1953 – Loka Neethi
 1953 – Sheriyo Thetto
 1953 – Vellakkaran
 1953 – Jenova
 1952 – Aathma Shanti
 1952 – Vishppinte Vili
 1952 – Premlekha
 1952 – Achan
 1951 – Vanamaala
 1951 – Yachakan
 1951 – Jeevitha Nauka
 1950 – Chechi
 1950 – Sasidharan
 1950 – Chandrika
 1950 – NallaThanka

As a singer
 Vayaranu Nammalkku Daivam as	Thaskaraveeran	1957

References

 എസ്.പി.പിള്ള: അലയൊടുങ്ങാത്ത ചിരി. (in Malayalam). Malayalam.webdunia.com. Retrieved 14 March 2011.

External links
 http://www.malayalachalachithram.com/profiles.php?i=6686
 
 SP Pillai at MSI

Kerala State Film Award winners
Indian male film actors
Male actors from Kerala
1913 births
1985 deaths
Male actors in Malayalam cinema
20th-century Indian male actors
People from Kottayam district
Indian male stage actors
Male actors in Malayalam theatre